Dendrometrinae is a very large subfamily of click beetles in the family Elateridae, containing 10 tribes worldwide, including several formerly recognized subfamily-rank groups such as Athoinae, Crepidomeninae, Denticollinae, Oxynopterinae, Prosterninae, and Semiotinae now all reduced to tribal rank or lower.

North American genera

 Actenicerus Kiesenwetter, 1858 g b
 Anostirus C.G.Thomson, 1859 g b
 Anthracopteryx Horn, 1891 b
 Ascoliocerus Méquignon, 1930 g b
 Athous Eschscholtz, 1829 b
 Beckerus Johnson in Majka & Johnson, 2008 g b
 Berninelsonius Leseigneur, 1970 g b
 Corymbitodes Buysson, 1904 g b
 Ctenicera Latreille, 1829 i c g b
 Denticollis Piller & Mitterpacher, 1783 g b
 Eanus Leconte, 1861 g b
 Elathous Reitter, 1890 g b
 Euplastius Schwarz, 1903 b
 Gambrinus LeConte, 1853
 Hadromorphus Motschoulsky, 1859 g b
 Harminius Fairmaire, 1851 g b
 Hemicrepidius Germar, 1839 g b
 Hypnoidus Dillwyn, 1829 g b
 Hypoganus Kiesenwetter, 1858 g b
 Hypolithus Eschscholtz, 1829 i c g b
 Ligmargus Stibick, 1976 g b
 Limonius Eschscholtz, 1829 i c g b
 Liotrichus Kiesenwetter, 1858 g b
 Margaiostus Stibick, 1978 g b
 Metanomus Buysson, 1887 g b
 Neopristilophus Buysson, 1894 g b
 Nitidolimonius Johnson in Majka & Johnson, 2008 g b
 Oxygonus LeConte g b
 Paractenicera Johnson in Majka & Johnson, 2008 g b
 Pheletes Kiesenwetter, 1858
 Prosternon Latreille, 1834 g b
 Pseudanostirus Dolin, 1964 g b
 Selatosomus Stephens, 1830 g b
 Setasomus Gurjeva, 1985 g b
 Sylvanelater Johnson in Majka & Johnson, 2008 g b

Data sources: i = ITIS, c = Catalogue of Life, g = GBIF, b = Bugguide.net

References

Further reading

External links

 

Elateridae